Kyyjärvi (lit. "adder lake") is a municipality of Finland. The municipality is unilingually Finnish.

Neighbouring municipalities are Alajärvi, Karstula, Kivijärvi, Perho and Soini. The municipality centre is located on the shores of Lake Kyyjärvi. Little villages Hokkala, Koskimäki-Huhtala, Kumpula, Noposenaho, Hokkasenaho, Nurmijoki, Oikari, Peuralinna, Pölkki, Saunakylä and Vehkaperä are living mostly from primary production (farming and forestry). Due to its location on the crossroads of two main Finnish roads (Valtatie 13 and 16) the municipality has also a remarkable number of services and little companies compared to its size.

Etymology
The origin of the name of Kyyjärvi is unknown but there are few theories of it. The first part of the name, "kyy", is Finnish word for adder (Vipera berus), a venomous snake. Järvi is Finnish word for lake. Adders can be found in Kyyjärvi, as everywhere in Finland. Another theory is that the first citizens moved to the area from the lake Kyyvesi and gave the name Kyyjärvi for their new home area and lake.

Among the locals, the municipality is playfully nicknamed "Kyy York", which is a reference to New York. Because of this, the municipality has adopted the following slogan: Kyy York – pieni kylä, suuri sydän ("small village, big heart").

History
The area of modern Kyyjärvi was originally hunting grounds for Tavastian people. The village of Kyyjärvi was first mentioned in 1565 as Kÿierffuj, when it was a part of the parish of Rautalampi. In 1628, the parish of Laukaa, including Kyyjärvi, was split off from Rautalampi while in 1639, Kyyjärvi became a part of the new Saarijärvi parish established during this year.

In 1775, Kyyjärvi became one of the villages in the new chapel community of Karstula, which became its own parish in 1858. In 1913, it was decided that the territory of the Kyyjärvi school district should become its own municipality and parish. The municipality was established in 1929 while the parish was established in 1944.

Proposed Suomenselkä municipality
Karstula, Kivijärvi and Kyyjärvi accepted the merger proposal, but Kannonkoski did not. After Kannonkoski left out of the planned merger, Kivijärvi also left out. The merger project of the remaining Karstula and Kyyjärvi failed at the Kyyjärvi municipal council meeting held on May 17, 2021, and the Ministry of Finance does not propose a forced merger either.

Nature
There are all together 46 lakes in Kyyjärvi. Biggest lakes in Kyyjärvi are Lake Kyyjärvi, Heinuanjärvi and Kirvesjärvi.

Transport
Kyyjärvi is served by Onnibus route Helsinki—Jyväskylä—Kokkola.

Notable individuals 
 Aila Paloniemi, Member of the Parliament of Finland

Twin towns
 Sorsele,  Sweden
 Võnnu Parish,  Estonia

References

External links

Municipality of Kyyjärvi – Official website 
Nopola News, Web Newspaper of Kyyjärvi

 
Populated places established in 1929